Kimi may refer to:

People 
 Kimi Djabate (born 1975), Bissau-Guinean Afro-beat/blues musician
 Kimi Katkar (born 1965), Indian Bollywood actress and model
 Kimi Koivisto (born 1992), Finnish ice hockey player
 Kimi Räikkönen (born 1979), Finnish Formula One driver
 Kimi Sato (born 1949), Japanese classical composer
 Kimi Verma (born 1977), Indian actress Kirandeep Verma
, Japanese women's basketball player

Other uses 
 Kimi Records, an Icelandic independent record label and distribution company
 Kimi (record label), a Japanese record label founded in 1990
 Kimi (film), an American thriller film directed by Steven Soderbergh
 Kimi Finster, fictional character in the animated Nickelodeon show Rugrats
 KIMI (FM), a radio station licensed to Malvern, Iowa, United States
 Kimi Station, a train station in Kurashiki, Okayama Prefecture, Japan
 Kimi (kabane) (君), honoric title bestowed by the Yamato Court in ancient Japan to members of the Kuni no miyatsuko (国造) class

See also 
 
 

Finnish masculine given names
Japanese feminine given names